Paludan is a surname. Notable people with the surname include:
Ann Paludan (1928–2014), British author of several books on Chinese history, sculpture, and architecture
Frederik Paludan-Müller (1809–1876), Danish poet born in Kerteminde, on the Island of Fyn
Hans Paludan Smith Schreuder (1817–1882), Norwegian 19th century missionary to Zulu
Jens Theodor Paludan Vogt (1830–1892), Norwegian engineer and first director of Kristiania Sporveisselskab (Oslo tramway operator)
Johannes Paludan (1912–2001), Danish architect
Knud Paludan (1908–1988), Danish ornithologist
Phillip S. Paludan (1938–2007), professor of Lincoln Studies at the University of Illinois, Springfield
Rasmus Paludan (1702–1759), Norwegian theologian and priest
Rasmus Paludan (born 1982), Danish politician